Pennulituba is a genus of monogeneans belonging to the family Ancyrocephalidae (sometimes considered as belonging to the Dactylogyridae).

Host and Species

The two known species of the genus are parasitic on the gills of the yellowfin goatfish Mulloidichthys vanicolensis (Mullidae) and were collected in the waters of the Pacific Ocean off New Caledonia.

The following species are considered valid according to WorRMS:
 Pennulituba cymansis Řehulková, Justine & Gelnar, 2010
 Pennulituba piratifalx Řehulková, Justine & Gelnar, 2010 (type-species)

References

Ancyrocephalidae
Monogenea genera